Knut Rasmussen may refer to:

Knud Rasmussen (1879–1933), Danish explorer
Knut Rasmussen (physician) (born 1938), Norwegian professor of medicine
Knut Rasmussen (barrister), Norwegian barrister